Flat Lick is an unincorporated community and census-designated place (CDP) in Knox County, Kentucky, United States. As of the 2010 census, the population was 960.

The oldest community in the county, Flat Lick was settled before 1784 and named for a salty rock which attracted wild animals.

Geography
Flat Lick is in eastern Knox County, northeast of the Cumberland River. U.S. Route 25E forms the western edge of the CDP; the highway leads northwest  to Barbourville, the county seat, and southeast  to Pineville.

Demographics

References

Census-designated places in Knox County, Kentucky
Census-designated places in Kentucky
Unincorporated communities in Knox County, Kentucky
Unincorporated communities in Kentucky